Churchlands Senior High School is an independent public secondary school located in Churchlands, a suburb of Perth, Western Australia, approximately  northwest from the Perth central business district. It is the largest school in Western Australia, with 2,758 students as of 2021.

Background and history
Churchlands Senior High School (Churchlands SHS) is a co-educational high school with a 2021 enrolment of approximately 2,758 students from Year 7 to Year 12.

On 6 November 1991, a female student was murdered in class when she was stabbed 18 times by her ex-boyfriend.

On 26 May 1997 the majority of the school was burnt down in a failed attempt to destroy evidence of a break-in. The school was largely rebuilt after spending a few years using demountable classrooms.

On 14 August 2008 the administration block was badly damaged by fire as a result of arson, and demountable offices were brought in to the school.
The time taken for refurbishment from the time of the fire until completion was over 13 months.

In 2011 Churchlands SHS joined the Education Department's Independent Public Schools programme.

Academic status 
Churchlands Senior High School students have received many major awards including three Beazley Medals. For the 2009 TEE, Churchlands was the highest ranked public school, based on the number of students who scored 75% or more over four subjects. For the 2008 TEE, Churchlands was the second-highest ranked public school, based on the number of students who scored 75% or more over four subjects.

WA school ranking

Year 12 student achievement data 

Beazley Medal academic winners

Each year, a Beazley Medal is presented to the top ranked academic student in Western Australia. Churchlands Senior High School recipients have been:
 2009: Hayley Anderson
 1992: Jonathon Robert Leslie Paget
 1989: Howard Ho-Wah Yip

Music 
Churchlands Senior High School's Gifted and Talented music program has run sincere 1972. Facilities include a 504-seat acoustically engineered concert hall, a music auditorium seating 254, a dedicated choral studio and with instrumental practice rooms. International recognition includes the attainment of honours at the Llangollen International Musical Eisteddfod in Wales and at the World Music Festival in Geneva. Student musicians perform for audiences in Australia and overseas with three-yearly tours to Europe, Asia and North America.

Ensemble performance is an integral part of the Churchlands music experience, and the performing ensembles include choirs, concert bands, orchestras, chamber groups, and guitar ensembles. To enter any level of the music program students must complete tests and auditions. Those who win a place in the program undertake an intensive course that is both practical and theoretical.

Enrolment patterns
Churchlands SHS is the largest school in Western Australia, with 2,758 students in 2021. Churchlands had 34 temporary transportable classrooms in 2018 to accommodate increasing student enrolment.

Notable alumni

Government
Kerry Sanderson – Governor of Western Australia, CEO of Fremantle Port Authority (1991-2008)
Eric Ripper - Deputy Premier and WA Treasurer 2001–2008, Leader of the Opposition in Western Australia 2008-2012

Academia and science
Natashia Boland - Mathematician
Aron Chakera - Rhodes Scholar
Mike Fitzpatrick - Rhodes Scholar
Andrew Poole - cave diver & explorer, co-discovered longest cave in Indonesia, and co-discovered the remipede species L. exleyi in a sink hole near Exmouth
Ian Puddey - Emeritus Professor, School of Medicine and Pharmacology, University of Western Australia

Art, entertainment and media
Taryn Fiebig - soprano, Opera Australia
Conor Barton - drummer, Mosquito Coast, Winner of Triple J Unearthed High 2015
Sally Carbon - radio host, journalist, and children story-book writer
Neil Eliot (1955-2007) - press photographer, Walkley Award 1991 and Press Photograph of the Year 1992
Neil Fisenden - flautist, Adelaide Symphony Orchestra and West Australian Symphony Orchestra
Christopher Malcolm - art curator, Director of the John Curtin Gallery
Allan Myers - clarinetist, Adelaide Symphony Orchestra and West Australian Symphony Orchestra
Michael Turkic - actor, director, and producer of musical theatre
Christine Turpin - timpanist, Melbourne Symphony Orchestra

Business
Mike Fitzpatrick - Director, Rio Tinto Ltd
John Gillam - Chairman Officeworks, CEO Bunnings, Director CSR Limited
Melanie Greensmith - fashion designer, co-founder Wheels and Doll Baby

Sport
Neil Brooks - swimming, Moscow Olympics 1980 gold medal 4 × 100 m medley relay, Los Angeles Olympics 1984 silver medal 4 × 100 m medley relay, bronze medal 4 × 100 m freestyle relay
Calvin "C.J." Bruton - basketballer, Australian Boomers, Brisbane Bullets NBL
Sharon Buchanan - hockey, Los Angeles Olympics 1984, Seoul Olympics 1988 gold medal, Barcelona Olympics 1992, Hockeyroos Captain
Sally Carbon - hockey, Seoul Olympics 1988 gold medal
Mike Fitzpatrick - VFL footballer, Carlton premiership captain 1981 & 1982, captained Victoria 1982, Chairman of the AFL Commission
Richard Hardwick - rugby, Wallabies, Western Force
Maddison Keeney - diving 3m synchronised springboard, bronze medal Rio de Janeiro Olympics 2016
Richard Pengelley - water polo, Los Angeles Olympics 1984 and Seoul Olympics 1988
Shannon Reynolds - canoe sprint K4 500, Tokyo Olympics 2020
Tom Stachewicz - swimming, Los Angeles Olympics 1984, Seoul Olympics 1988, Barcelona Olympics 1992 - Swimming Western Australia Hall of Fame 2009
Christine Stanton - high jumper, Moscow Olympics 1980, Los Angeles Olympics 1984, Seoul Olympics 1988
David Watts - rowing, Rio de Janeiro Olympics 2016
Sam Welsford - cycling men's 4000m team pursuit, silver medal Rio de Janeiro Olympics 2016

See also

 List of schools in the Perth metropolitan area

References

External links 
 Main School web site
 Music Department web site
 Department of Education and Training Gifted and Talented web site

Public high schools in Perth, Western Australia
1962 establishments in Australia
Educational institutions established in 1962